The National Institute of Mental Health and Neuro-Sciences is a medical institution in Bangalore, India. NIMHANS is the apex centre for mental health and neuroscience education in the country. It is an Institute of National Importance operates autonomously under the Ministry of Health and Family Welfare. NIMHANS is ranked 4th best medical institute in India, in the current National Institutional Ranking Framework.

History
The history of the institute dates back to 1847, when the Bangalore Lunatic Asylum was founded. In 1925, the Government of Mysore rechristened the asylum as the Mental Hospital. The Mysore Government Mental Hospital became the first institute in India for postgraduate training in psychiatry.

The National Institute of Mental Health and Neurosciences (NIMHANS) was the result of the amalgamation of the erstwhile State Mental Hospital and the All India Institute of Mental Health (AIIMH) established by the Government of India in 1954. The institute was inaugurated on 27 December 1974, establishing it as an autonomous body under the Societies Registration Act to lead in the area of medical service and research in the country.

On 14 November 1994, NIMHANS was conferred a deemed university status by the University Grants Commission with academic autonomy. The institute has been declared as an Institute of National Importance by an act of parliament in 2012. In March 2017, the Government of India passed the Mental Healthcare Bill 2016, which also proposes to set up NIMHANS-like institutions across the nation.

Campus
NIMHANS has five campuses in the city, spread over an area of 174 acres of urban establishments, which includes 30 acres of an under-construction Bangalore North campus. The main campuses of the institute are located in Byrasandra (hospital wing) and Lakkasandra (academic and administrative wing) localities on either side of the Hosur Road. The 'Community Mental Health Center' is located in the Sakalawara area on Bannerghatta Road. The 'NIMHANS Centre for Well Being' is situated in a residential area in BTM Layout. A state-of-the-art convention centre located in the main campus frequently hosts international conferences, seminars, trade shows, expositions, and media events.

Organization and administration

Governance 

The National Institute of Mental Health and Neurosciences is a multidisciplinary institute for patient care and academic pursuit in the frontier area of mental health and neurosciences. The priority gradient adopted at the institute is service, manpower development and research. A multidisciplinary integrated approach is the mainstay of this institute, paving the way to translate the results from the bench to the bedside. Several national and international funding organizations provide resources for academic and research activities.

Departments

Biophysics
Biostatistics
Basic Neurosciences
Human Genetics
Neurochemistry
Neuromicrobiology
Neuropathology
Neurophysiology
Neurovirology
Mental Health Education
Clinical Psychology
Child and adolescent psychiatry
Psychiatric Social Work
Psychiatry
Nursing
Clinical Neuroscience
Neurosurgery
Clinical Psychopharmacology and Neurotoxicology
Neuroimaging and Interventional Radiology
Neurology
Epidemiology
Neurological Rehabilitation
Neuroanaesthesia and Neurocritical care
Psychiatric rehabilitation
Speech Pathology and Audiology
Transfusion Medicine and Haematology

Central Facilities

Advanced Centre for Ayurveda in Mental Health and Neurosciences
Central Animal Research Facility
Sakalwara Community Mental Health Centre
Centre for Public Health
Centre for Addiction Medicine
Biomedical Engineering 
Engineering Section
Library and Information Centre
Magneto-encephalography Centre
PET MRI Centre
Neurobiology Research Centre
NIMHANS Centre for Well Being
Virtual Learning Centre
Center for Molecular Imaging
Centre for Brain Mapping
Gamma Knife Centre
NIMHANS Health Centre
NIMHANS Integrated Centre for Yoga
NIMHANS Gymkhana
Nutrition and Dietetics Centre
Physiotherapy Centre
NIMHANS Digital Academy
NIMHANS Convention Centre
NIMHANS Gymkhana
WHO Collaborating Centre for Injury Prevention and Safety Promotion

Academics

Academic programs

Doctor of Philosophy
(a) Institute Fellowship
 Ph.D. in Clinical Psychology                
 Ph.D. in Neurophysiology                    
 Ph.D. in Psychiatric Social Work                
 Ph.D. in Speech Pathology & Audiology             
 Ph.D. in Biostatistics
 Ph.D. in Clinical Neurosciences (ICMR Fellowship)
   
(b) External Fellowship
 Ph.D. in Biophysics  
 Ph.D. in Biostatistics  
 Ph.D. in Child & Adolescent Psychiatry  
 Ph.D. in Clinical Psychology  
 Ph.D. in Human Genetics  
 Ph.D. in Neurochemistry  
 Ph.D. in Neuroimaging & Interventional Radiology  
 Ph.D. in Neurological Rehabilitation  
 Ph.D. in Neurology    
 Ph.D. in Neuroimaging & Interventional Radiology
 Ph.D. in Neuromicrobiology  
 Ph.D. in Neuropathology  
 Ph.D. in Neurophysiology  
 Ph.D. in Neurovirology  
 Ph.D. in Nursing   
 Ph.D. in Psychiatric Social Work  
 Ph.D. in Mental Health Rehabilitation  
 Ph.D. in Psychiatry
 Ph.D. in History of Psychiatry
 Ph.D. in Clinical Psychopharmacology & Neurotoxicolog  
 Ph.D. in Speech Pathology & Audiology

Super Speciality Medicine Courses
 DM in Neuroimaging and Interventional Radiology
 DM in Neurology (Post MBBS)
 DM in Neurology (Post MD/DNB)              
 DM in Child & Adolescent Psychiatry
 DM in Addiction Psychiatry
 DM in Forensic Psychiatry
 DM in Geriatric Psychiatry
 DM in Neuroanaesthesia & Neurocritical Care
 DM in Neuropathology
 M.Ch. in Neurosurgery (Post MBBS)                 
 M.Ch. in Neurosurgery (Post MS/DNB)

Post-graduate Degree/Fellowship
 MD in Psychiatry    
 Fellowship in Psychosocial Support in Disaster Management
 Fellowship in Geriatric Mental Health Care
 Fellowship in Mental Health Education
 Fellowship in Geriatric Mental Health Nursing
 Fellowship in Psychiatric Rehabilitation
 Fellowship in Psychosocial Care for elderly
 M.Phil. in Biophysics
 M.Phil. in Clinical Psychology
 M.Phil. in Neurophysiology
 M.Phil. in Neurosciences
 M.Phil. in Psychiatric Social work   
 Masters in Public Health
 M.Sc. in Psychiatric Nursing
 M.Sc. in Biostatistics

Post-doctoral Fellowship
 Child & Adolescent Psychiatry                      
 Neuroanaesthesia                              
 Neurocritical Care                         
 Neuroinfection                              
 Hospital Infection Control                                                   
 Epilepsy                              
 Movement Disorders                          
 Neuromuscular Disorder                      
 Stroke                           
 Neuropathology
 Paediatric Neurology                          
 Transfusion Medicine                            
 Neurological Rehabilitation                        
 Acute Care & Emergency Psychiatry                
 Community Mental Health                    
 Addiction Medicine
 Forensic Psychiatry                    
 Consultation Liaison Psychiatry                
 Geriatric Psychiatry                        
 Obsessive Compulsive disorder & related disorders        
 Clinical Neurosciences & Therapeutics in Schizophrenia
 Non-Invasive Brain Stimulation of Psychiatric disorders
 Cognitive Neurosciences
 Women's Mental Health

Rankings

The National Institute of Mental Health and Neurosciences has been ranked 4th among medical institution in India by the National Institutional Ranking Framework medical ranking for 2022.

Mental Health Outreach 
NIMHANS experts criticized a report on mental health in India published by the World Health Organization. The head of the psychiatry department, S K Chaturvedi, said that the figures by the WHO were highly inflated. Where, in the report, it alleges that 36% of Indians suffer from depression, the highest among all the countries, the NIMHANS faculty state that the incidence of depression is much lower due to a stronger social support system and family structure. However, the lifetime prevalence of depression in India measured by the study was only 9%, and the figure of 36% was a different metric that was mistakenly reported.
In May 2015, the faculty association of the institute lodged criticism against the 'Juvenile Justice Bill' which was tabled in parliament. Preeti Jacob, from the Department of Child and Adolescent Psychiatry, was quoted as saying "Juveniles are less culpable and are much more amenable to rehabilitative efforts and thus should not be transferred to the adult criminal justice system. The assessments that are being proposed in the bill in order to ascertain the mental capacity to commit an offence are arbitrary and unscientific."

In December 2014, it was reported that a soldier from the Indian Navy was being held in NIMHANS for a month to evaluate whether he was suffering from mental illness, after acting as a whistleblower. After the month-long evaluation, it was concluded that the Navy person was not suffering from any mental illness.
In July 2013, TOI reported that NIMHANS was collaborating with the Central Bureau of Investigation to train its staff with interrogation techniques. In 2012, the central government approached NIMHANS to suppress anti-nuclear protests in regard to building the Kudankulam Nuclear Power Plant. The government asked NIMHANS to dispatch psychiatrists to Kudankulam to counsel protesters. To fulfil the plan, NIMHANS developed a team of six members, all of them from the Department of Social Psychiatry. The psychiatrists were sent to get a "peek into the protesters' minds" and help them learn the importance of the plant.

In 2008, a reality show contestant, Shinjini Sen, after getting reprimanded by the TV show judges, temporarily lost her voice, and physical mobility. It was alleged by the media that the television show judges' behaviour caused such disability. To resolve her case, she was flown from Kolkata to Bangalore's NIMHANS to be treated for a neurobiological condition. Professor B N Gangadhar, the then medical superintendent, told the press, "We can say at this juncture that she could be suffering from depression. Depression does not lead to permanent loss of speech or physical disability. We are diagnosing why that has happened. There could be complex neurological factors leading to such conditions."

Controversies
In February 2014, NIMHANS approached the Karnataka Film Chamber of Commerce to complain about a film to be released with the same name. Although initially, the institution was able to block the release of the film if it was named as such, subsequently, the film-maker was able to launch his film without renaming it, once the Censor Board and KFCC approved the name in its second round.

Notable people
NIMHANS has a strong alumni network of medical scientists and doctors, taking over many prestigious positions across the world. Some of the prominent people associated with the institute include clinical psychologists H. Narayan Murthy, Radhika Chandiramani, Satwant Pasricha, Elayidath Muhammad, philosophers and yoga therapists S. K. Ramachandra Rao H. R. Nagendra, psychiatrists M. Sarada Menon, Shekhar Seshadri, Jaswant Singh Neki, Valsamma Eapen, neuroscientists, Turaga Desiraju, Vijayalakshmi Ravindranath, Ganesan Venkatasubramanian Bilikere Dwarakanath, neurologists Naeem Sadiq, Sunil Pradhan, and neurosurgeons, N. K. Venkataramana, R. Marthanda Varma among others.

Bibliography

See also 
Mental health in India

Notes

References

External links

 

Neuroscience research centres in India
Medical research institutes in India
Medical and health sciences universities in India
Hospitals in Bangalore
Research institutes in Bangalore
Mental health organisations in India
1974 establishments in Karnataka